Nella Giacomelli (1873–1949) was an Italian anarchist.

References 

1873 births
1949 deaths
Italian anarchists